Nitrogen acid may refer to:

Nitric acid, HNO3
Nitrous acid, HNO2
Hyponitrous acid, H2N2O2